Hell on Wheels is an American dramatic television series created and produced by Joe and Tony Gayton. The series was broadcast in the United States and Canada on the cable channel AMC and premiered on November 6, 2011. Set in the 1860s at the end of the United States Civil War, the series starred Anson Mount as Cullen Bohannon, a former Confederate soldier determined to exact revenge on the Union soldiers who murdered his wife. His quest for vengeance sent him westward to Nebraska's "Hell on Wheels", the lawless town that moved with the construction of the first transcontinental railroad. However, things got complicated when Cheyenne and Sioux tribes attack the construction of the railroad, bent on destroying the project because it is being built through their lands.

On November 7, 2014, AMC renewed the series for a fifth and final season of fourteen episodes. The final season was split into two parts, with seven episodes airing in the summers of 2015 and 2016 respectively. The fifth season premiered on July 18, 2015. The second half began on June 11, 2016, and the series ended July 23, 2016.

Series overview

Episodes

Season 1 (2011–12)

Season 2 (2012)

Season 3 (2013)

Season 4 (2014)

Season 5 (2015–16)

Ratings

References

External links 
 
 

 
Hell on Wheels